Alhagi is a genus of Old World plants in the family Fabaceae. They are commonly called camelthorns or manna trees. There are three to five species.

Alhagi species have proportionally the deepest root system of any plants - a 1 m high shrub may have a main root more than 15 m long; due to their deep root system Alhagi species are drought-avoiding plants that utilize ground water, adapting in that way perfectly to the hyper-arid environment.

Alhagi species are used as food plants by the larvae of some Lepidoptera species including Coleophora argyrella which feeds exclusively on A. maurorum.

The genus name comes from the Arabic word for pilgrim.

Uses in Traditional Medicine
Alhagi in Persian is "KhareShotor" which means thistle of camels, as camels can eat it with its thorns. As such, it was figured out that the plant can sustain the abdominal organs in severe thirst. In the Middle East, its boiled or distilled juice is used against kidney and bladder stones.
Also, the plant foliage is the habitat of a scale insect which produces Manna of hedysarum or Tarangabeen, which is used as a remedy for neonatal jaundice.

References

External links

Jepson Manual Treatment
Alhagi maurorum Medik
 Water relation characteristics of Alhagi sparsifolia and consequences for a sustainable management 

Hedysareae
Fabaceae genera